Thomas Frost is an American music producer.

Thomas Frost may also refer to:

 Thomas Frost (writer) (1821–1908), English journalist
 Thomas Frost, character in the TV series Dominion
 Tom Frost (1936–2018), rock climber